WW may refer to:

Arts and entertainment
 Adelaide Writers' Week, a literary festival held annually in Adelaide, South Australia
 WW (album), a 2005 album by the Norwegian metal group Gehenna
 William Whopper, an evil property developer in the Australian 1980 children's TV programme Secret Valley
 Wonder Woman, a fictional superhero
WW, the production code for the 1968–69 Doctor Who serial The Krotons

Businesses and organizations
 WW International, an American dietetics and nutrition company, formerly called Weight Watchers
 Bmibaby (2002-2012, IATA airline code WW)
 WOW Air (2012-2019, IATA airline code WW)
 Winchester and Western Railroad (reporting mark WW)

Food and diets
 Weight Watchers (diet), a comprehensive diet program by WW International.

Places
 County Wicklow, Ireland (vehicle plate code WW)
 Westerwaldkreis, Germany (vehicle plate code WW)

Other uses
 "Warm white", a descriptor of light source color temperature, as defined in the JIS Z 9112 standard, and used by Exif tags
 William H. Webster (born 1924), director of the FBI and CIA, referred to in the Kryptos sculpture as "WW"
 Woodrow Wilson, President of the United States from 1913-1921
Woodrow Wilson Teaching Fellowship, aka WW Teaching Fellowship
 World war
 "Wrong word", in proofreading